Jan Jaroměřský (born September 10, 1988) is a Czech professional ice hockey defenceman for HC Oceláři Třinec of the Czech Extraliga.

Jaroměřský previously played for HC Olomouc, joining the team in 2013 and helped them win promotion to the Czech Extraliga that season. He would go on to play 261 games for Olomouc over the next seven seasons. On April 30, 2020, Jaroměřský moved to HC Oceláři Třinec.

References

External links

1988 births
Living people
HC Benátky nad Jizerou players
Czech ice hockey defencemen
BK Havlíčkův Brod players
Rytíři Kladno players
BK Mladá Boleslav players
HC Oceláři Třinec players
HC Olomouc players
People from Turnov
HC Vrchlabí players
Sportspeople from the Liberec Region